Candy Racer (Japanese: キャンディーレーサー Kyandii Reesaa) is the fifth studio album by Japanese singer Kyary Pamyu Pamyu, released on October 27, 2021 by Nippon Columbia and its imprint KRK Lab as her first album release on the label.

Background 
After completing promotions for her fourth studio album Japamyu in early 2019, Kyary Pamyu Pamyu's contract with Warner Music Japan expired, leaving her as an independent artist. On May 10, 2019, she independently released the digital single "Kimi ga Iine Kuretara" through her agency Asobisystem's in-house label Asobimusic. It served as a theme song to the Japanese drama series Mukai no Bazuru Kazoku. The single was later re-released on vinyl in February 2020. Kyary then performed her next single "Kamaitachi" on her birthday live with her music producer Yasutaka Nakata on January 29, 2020. The song was released as a digital single on April 24, 2020, during the lockdowns brought by the COVID-19 pandemic. Her supposed national tour Kamaitachi Tour 2020 was canceled because of the aforementioned pandemic.
In early January 2021, Asobisystem announced that Kyary has signed a recording contract with Japanese record label Nippon Columbia and has established her own imprint label KRK Lab as part of her tenth anniversary as a singer. She then released a new digital single titled "Gum Gum Girl" on January 29, 2021, which was her 28th birthday. On August 16, 2021, Kyary released a new digital single "Gentenkaihi". On September 10, 2021, the album release was announced. "Jumping Up" was released as a lead track from the album on September 29, 2021, followed by "Dodonpa" on October 13, 2021 with its accompanying lyric video. The music video for the title track was released on November 2, 2021 on YouTube.

Commercial performance 
Candy Racer debuted at the twenty-second spot of the Oricon Weekly Albums Chart, selling 3,065 copies on its first week of release. It continued to chart for three more weeks, and in total sold 3,932 copies.

Track listing 
All songs written, arranged, and produced by Yasutaka Nakata.

Charts

Sales

References 

Kyary Pamyu Pamyu albums
2021 albums
Japanese-language albums
Nippon Columbia albums
Albums produced by Yasutaka Nakata
Electronic albums by Japanese artists